Phyllis Galembo (born 1952) is an American photographer living in New York City.

Galembo has published seven monographs, including,  Sodo (2021), Mexico: Masks, Rituals (2019), Maske (2016), Dressed for thrills : 100 years of Halloween costumes & masquerade (2002), Divine inspiration : from Benin to Bahia (1993), Vodou : visions and voices of Haiti (1998), Pale Pink (1983). Galembo was a Guggenheim Foundation Fellow in 2014, as well as a New York Foundation for the Arts Fellow in 2016, 2010, and 1996, and a Senior Fulbright Research Award in 1993–94, Kings, Chiefs and Women of Power, Nigeria.    She earned an MFA from the University of Wisconsin at Madison, 1977.

Exhibitions 
In 1993, Galembo showed work illustrating the religious traditions of Nigeria and the spiritual practices of Brazil introduced from Africa via the slave trade at the International Center of Photography. In 1998 Kings, Chiefs, and Women of Power: Images from Nigeria was exhibited at the American Museum of Natural History.  In 2005 her work was also exhibited at Sepia International, in 2007 at the Tang Museum (Skidmore College, Saratoga Springs, curated by Ian Berry) as West African Masquerade: Photographs by Phyllis Galembo. Phyllis Galembo: Maske was exhibited at Steven Kasher Gallery in N.Y.C. in 2011 . Work by Galembo was included in the 2013 exhibition The Encyclopedic Palace at the 55th Venice Biennale, curated by Massimiliano Gioni. In 2020 Galembo's work was exhibited at the Boca Raton Museum of Art  in a show entitled Phyllis Galembo: Maske.

Collections 
Works by Galembo are in the collection of the Mead Art Museum at Amherst College, the Museum of Fine Arts, Houston, the Metropolitan Museum of Art and the Wisconsin Union Art Collection.

Publications 

 Pale pink (1983)
Aso-ebi, Cloth of the Family (1997), sponsored by New York Council for the Arts 
 Divine inspiration: from Benin to Bahia (1998)
 Dressed for thrills: 100 years of Halloween costumes & masquerade (2002)
 Vodou: visions and voices of Haiti (20005)
 Maske (2010, 2016)
Phyllis Galembo: Mexico, Masks and Rituals (2019)
 Sodo, Datz press (2021)

References

General references

Living people
Photographers from New York City
20th-century American photographers
21st-century American photographers
1952 births